Florentino Ávidos (November 18, 1870 – February 28, 1956) was a Brazilian politician.  He was the 17th president (governor) of the Brazilian state of Espirito Santo, and, later, a senator of that state on Brazilian Senate.

Career 
He was an engineer by trade and was elected for governor of Espirito Santo in 1924.  He governed the state from May 23, 1924 to June 30, 1928.  he built roads and bridges in order to improve the communications in the state, being the most important the "Five Bridges Complex" connecting the Isle of Vitória to the continent and to the Isle of the Prince as well.  These bridges were named "Florentino Ávidos", in his homage, after his death in 1956.

References

External links
 

1870 births
1956 deaths
Governors of Espírito Santo
Members of the Federal Senate (Brazil)